Johannes Martinus Maria Versleijen (born 29 December 1955), better known as Jan Versleijen, is a Dutch professional association football coach who last managed South African PSL side Ajax Cape Town.

Career
Born in Venlo, Versleijen has managed a number teams in his native Netherlands, including FC Wageningen, Go Ahead Eagles, De Graafschap, Dordrecht '90, VVV-Venlo and TOP Oss. Versleijen has also coached throughout Asia, managing teams in Japan (JEF United Chiba), the United Arab Emirates (Al-Jazira and Al-Shaab), and in Saudi Arabia (Ettifaq and Al-Wehda).

He was appointed manager of the Australian under-20 national team in June 2008.

In November 2011, Versleijen, after three and a half years and one Under 17, two under 20 World Cup cycles, decided not to re-apply for a position in Australia's youth set up, after the FFA restructures his old role, splitting it into two positions.

In January 2013, after the dismissal of Maarten Stekelenburg, and the interim managerial positions of both Wilfred Mugeyi and Jan Pruijn for Ajax Cape Town, Versleijen took over as the third care taker for the Cape club, intended to see the South African club through until the end of the 2012-13 Premier Soccer League season.

On 24 April 2013, Versleijen announced his early resignation from his interim coaching position at Ajax Cape Town, leaving the Cape club while placed in the relegation zone, just ahead of their derby match against crosstown rivals Chippa United. His reason for leaving the club was due to the hiring of Muhsin Ertuğral as the newly appointed Technical Director at the Cape club without his knowledge.

Managerial statistics

References

External links

1955 births
Living people
Dutch expatriate sportspeople in South Africa
Dutch football managers
Dutch expatriate football managers
FC Wageningen managers
Go Ahead Eagles managers
VVV-Venlo managers
De Graafschap managers
FC Dordrecht managers
J1 League managers
Saudi Professional League managers
JEF United Chiba managers
TOP Oss managers
Sportspeople from Venlo
Henan Songshan Longmen F.C. managers
Ettifaq FC managers
Al-Shaab CSC managers
Al-Wehda Club (Mecca) managers
Ajax Cape Town F.C. managers
Expatriate football managers in China
Expatriate football managers in Saudi Arabia
Expatriate football managers in the United Arab Emirates
Dutch expatriate sportspeople in the United Arab Emirates
Al Jazira Club managers
Dutch expatriate sportspeople in China
Dutch expatriate sportspeople in Saudi Arabia
Dutch expatriate sportspeople in Japan
Dutch expatriate sportspeople in Australia
Expatriate football managers in Japan
Expatriate soccer managers in South Africa